Don't Forget I Love You is a 2022 Chinese romantic comedy film and the sequel to The Stolen Years. It was written and directed by Wong Chun-chun and starring Gulnazar and Jasper Liu. The film follows the love story of a psychologist and a composer. The film premiered in China on 14 February 2022, during the Valentine's Day.

Cast
 Gulnazar as Xu Xingyue, a psychologist. 
 Jasper Liu as Lu Yao, a composer with brain disorder after operation.
 Zhang Xinyi as Lu Hong
 Edward Ma as Matthew
 Zhang Yang
 Luo Ji

Production
Principal photography started in Chengdu on 2 July 2021 and wrapped on August 26.

Soundtrack

Release
Don't Forget I Love You was released on 14 February 2022, in China.

References

External links
 
 

2022 romantic comedy films
2020s Mandarin-language films
Chinese romantic comedy films
Films shot in Sichuan
Films directed by Wong Chun-chun